Akash Manoj is an Indian cardiology researcher and inventor from Tamil Nadu. He is known for his award-winning research on "silent" heart attacks.  He developed a novel technique that can non-invasively detect and alert at-risk patients of a potential asymptomatic heart-attack. His method involves transcutaneously isolating, identifying, spectroscopically analyzing, and sensing elevation in the levels of a cardiac biomarker called heart-type fatty acid binding protein (h-FABP) in realtime – a process that significantly establishes a path to preventative cardiovascular healthcare.

Personal life 
Akash graduated high school from The Ashok Leyland School in Hosur, Tamil Nadu. His recent interview with Forbes India suggests that he is currently studying at a medical school in Prague, Czech Republic.

Accolades 
Akash was awarded with "National Child Award for Exceptional Achievement" (Gold Medallion) [Now: Pradhan Mantri Rashtriya Bal Puraskar] by the President of India and an award at Intel ISEF 2018. Additionally, he has received several other notable national and international awards.

References

2001 births
Living people
People from Tamil Nadu
Indian medical researchers
21st-century Indian inventors